Diosmely Peña Contreras  (born 12 June 1985 in Consolación del Sur, Pinar del Río) is a Cuban sprinter. She competed in the 4 × 400 m relay event at the 2012 Summer Olympics.

Personal bests
400 m: 51.88 s A –  Cali, 4 July 2008
800 m: 2:02.41 min –  La Habana, 28 May 2011
1000 m: 2:43.95 min –  La Habana, 23 September 2011

Achievements

References

External links
 

People from Pinar del Río
Cuban female sprinters
1985 births
Living people
People from Consolación del Sur
Olympic athletes of Cuba
Athletes (track and field) at the 2012 Summer Olympics
Pan American Games medalists in athletics (track and field)
Pan American Games gold medalists for Cuba
Athletes (track and field) at the 2011 Pan American Games
Medalists at the 2011 Pan American Games
Olympic female sprinters
21st-century Cuban women